Sven Gerner-Mathisen (born 25 November 1947) is a Norwegian sailor. He was born in Bærum. He competed at the 1972 Summer Olympics in Munich.

Sven Gerner-Mathisen is the son of late Arild Gerner-Mathisen, founder of Gerner-Mathisen Shipping Ltd.

References

External links

1947 births
Living people
Sportspeople from Bærum
Olympic sailors of Norway
Norwegian male sailors (sport)
Sailors at the 1972 Summer Olympics – Dragon